Elaver chisosa is a species of spider in the spider family Clubionidae. It was first named Clubionoides chisosa when circumscribed in 1966.

The species closely resembles Elaver dorotheae.  It is about 1/5th of an inch (5.26 mm) in length overall.  Its carapace and appendages are pale yellowish brown, and its abdomen is gray-brown with dark chevrons and stripes.

The female holotype was collected from the Basin, Chisos Mountains, Big Bend National Park, Texas, in September 1950

References

Clubionidae
Spiders described in 1966